Vitim is a rural locality (a settlement) in Muysky District, Republic of Buryatia, Russia. The population was 28 as of 2010.

Geography 
Vitim is located 69 km southeast of Taksimo (the district's administrative centre) by road. Shivery is the nearest rural locality.

References 

Rural localities in Muysky District